Get Loaded in the Park is an inner-city music festival held on Clapham Common in London annually since 2004. It was held on the August Bank Holiday Sunday until 2010 when the festival took a years sabbatical, before returning in 2011 with a new date of Sunday 12 June.

In its original format it was held on the August Bank Holiday as the rock/pop based second day in the 'Clapham Weekender' with the electronic/dance based South West Four occurring on the Saturday. Then in 2009, the whole weekend became an all electronic/dance based affair, before 2010 when South West Four took over the Sunday and became a 2-day festival, and continues to be as of 2011. It is held on the same weekend as Creamfields UK and the Reading and Leeds Festivals.

Get Loaded in the Park has also spawned several nightclub events, under the banner of Get Loaded in the Dark.

List of headliners

2011: Razorlight
2010: No festival
2009: Orbital
2008: Iggy & The Stooges
2007: The Streets
2006: Babyshambles
2005: Happy Mondays
2004: Happy Mondays

Music festivals in London
2004 establishments in England
Recurring events established in 2004